The 1880 United States presidential election in Arkansas took place on November 2, 1880, as part of the 1880 United States presidential election. Voters chose six representatives, or electors to the Electoral College, who voted for president and vice president.

Arkansas voted for the Democratic nominee, Winfield Scott Hancock, over the Republican nominee, James A. Garfield by a margin of 17.47%.

Results

See also
 United States presidential elections in Arkansas

References

Arkansas
1880
1880 Arkansas elections